Thandikkappatta Nyayangal is a 1983 Indian Tamil-language film written, produced and directed by M. Bhaskar. The film stars Sivakumar and Lakshmi, with Sivachandran, Rohini and Baby Meena in supporting roles. It was released on 16 September 1983.

Plot 
Dr. Prabhu is a renowned neuro surgeon and a very eminent person, who is very happy with his wife Radha (Lakshmi) and his daughter Lakshmi (Baby Meena). One day he meets his childhood friend, Rajesh(Siva Chandran) who is an artist. Dr. Prabhu is very affectionate on Rajesh as he sponsored his medical studies. Radha do not liked Rajesh or his paintings and art work as it involves nudity and Radha feels it was too vulgar. One day Dr.Prabhu brings Rajesh home as he is very ill and forces Radha to take care of him. Radha refuses to touch him and nurse him. But Dr.Prabhu convinces her. On their wedding anniversary, Radha sings a song and suffers breathlessness, Dr. Prabhu gives her a resuscitation and calms her to sleep. Next day in his hospital he is appreciated for his success in handling a critical surgery. Prabhu returns home happily, just to find a letter from Radha, that she had defiled herself by sleeping with Rajesh, and she is leaving Prabhu and she takes their daughter Lakshmi along. Devasted by this Dr. Prabhu becomes a nomad and wanders around. He meets a sage, who teaches him siddha and asks him to cure people for free. 

Did Prabhu met his wife and daughter? Did they reunite? This forms the rest of the story.

Cast 
 Sivakumar as Prabhu
 Lakshmi as Radha
 Sivachandran as Rajesh
 Rohini as Lakshmi
 Baby Meena as young Lakshmi
 Senthil as Sokki
 Y. G. Mahendran as Director Sithan Banerjee (Fake)

Production 
Thandikkappatta Nyayangal was written, produced and directed by M. Bhaskar under Oscar Movies. Cinematography was handled by T. S. Vinayakam, and editing by M. Vellaichami. The opening scene where Prabhu (Sivakumar) is shown performing a surgery, was filmed at Government General Hospital, Madras after Bhaskar obtained permission.

Soundtrack 
The music was composed by Shankar–Ganesh, with lyrics by Pulamaipithan. Poet Muthulingam had also written a song, "Thein Paayum" for this film, but it was not used until Bhaskar's other film Pournami Alaigal (1985). Nonetheless, Muthulingam was still credited.

Release 
Thandikkappatta Nyayangal was released on 16 September 1983. Sivakumar has named the film one of his personal favourites.

References

External links 
 

1980s Tamil-language films
Films directed by M. Bhaskar
Films scored by Shankar–Ganesh